Fernão is a municipality in the state of São Paulo in Brazil. The population is 1,727 (2020 est.) in an area of 101 km². The elevation is 558 m.

References

Municipalities in São Paulo (state)